The scrub robins or bush chats are medium-sized insectivorous birds in the genus Cercotrichas. They were formerly in the thrush family, (Turdidae), but are more often now treated as part of the Old World flycatcher family, (Muscicapidae).  They are not closely related to the Australian scrub-robins, genus Drymodes in the family Petroicidae.

The genus name Cercotrichas is from Ancient Greek kerkos, "tail" and trikhas, "thrush".

Scrub robins are mainly African species of open woodland or scrub, which nest in bushes or on the ground, but the rufous-tailed scrub robin also breeds in southern Europe and east to Pakistan.

The genus contains the following species:

 Karoo scrub robin, Cercotrichas coryphaeus
 Forest scrub robin, Cercotrichas leucosticta
 Bearded scrub robin, Cercotrichas quadrivirgata
 Miombo scrub robin, Cercotrichas barbata
 Black scrub robin, Cercotrichas podobe
 Rufous-tailed scrub robin, Cercotrichas galactotes
 Kalahari scrub robin, Cercotrichas paena
 Brown-backed scrub robin, Cercotrichas hartlaubi
 White-browed scrub robin, Cercotrichas leucophrys
 Brown scrub robin, Cercotrichas signata

References

Further reading